The 1905 Giro di Lombardia was the 1st edition of the Giro di Lombardia, a classic one-day cycle race organised by La Gazzetta dello Sport in Italy. The single day event was held on 12 November 1905. It was won by Italian Giovanni Gerbi of the Maino team.

The race

The race started with 55 riders. Giovanni Gerbi made his winning move at a railroad crossing. He jumped up the crossing and back onto the course and rode ahead, while a few riders behind crashed. Gerbi stretched his advantage to forty minutes. Of the riders that began the race, 12 finished the course.

Results

References
Citations

Giro di Lombardia
1905 in Italian sport
1905 in road cycling
November 1995 sports events in Europe